Presidential elections were held on 30 July 2013 in Pakistan to elect the 12th President of Pakistan. Incumbent President Asif Ali Zardari’s term was scheduled to expire on 8 September 2013; and as such, Article 41 of the Constitution of Pakistan required the elections to be held no later than 8 August 2013. The Electoral College of Pakistan – a joint sitting of the Senate, National Assembly and Provincial Assemblies – were tasked with electing a new president to succeed President Zardari, who declined to seek a second term in office. After the Pakistan Peoples Party and its allies boycotted the presidential election, the two candidates were Mamnoon Hussain backed by the Pakistan Muslim League (N), and Wajihuddin Ahmed backed by Pakistan Tehreek-e-Insaf. Agra-born Hussain was elected president by a majority securing 432 votes. The elections were the first time in Pakistani history where a civilian president was elected while an incumbent civilian President was still in office, completing a historic and democratic transition of power that began with the 2013 General Elections.

Background
Following the 2013 general elections, it was expected that the new president would be chosen by the party that won a plurality and thus headed by Prime Minister Nawaz Sharif, the Pakistan Muslim League (N). It is the first time in the country that a president elect has been chosen in the presence of a sitting president.

Schedule
The Election Commission of Pakistan announced the initial election schedule on 17 July 2013. All nomination papers for candidates had to be submitted by 24 July, with scrutiny occurring on 26 July. Candidates then had an additional 3 days to withdraw their nomination, after which the official candidate list was announced. The elections were originally to take place via secret ballot on 6 August, and official results confirmed the next day. The elections would be presided by the Chief Justices of the Islamabad High Court and the 4 provincial High Courts.

The Supreme Court of Pakistan on 24 July, revised the date for the presidential election on the appeal of the ruling party, PML (N), asking the election commission to hold it on 30 July instead of 6 August. The court made the order as many of the lawmakers who will elect a replacement for President Asif Ali Zardari will be paying pilgrimages or offering special prayers on 6 August for the holy month of Ramadan, which ends a few days later, thus making it potentially difficult for some lawmakers to oblige with their religious duties along with the election. The petition was filed by the leader of the house in the Senate Raja Zafarul Haq on the same day.

The court ordered the Election Commission of Pakistan to change the election schedule on the appeal of the Federal government: nomination papers were filed on 24 July, their scrutiny was held on 26 July, the withdrawal of candidature up to 12 noon on 27 July and the final list of candidates was published at 5pm on 27 July. The polling was held on 30 July.

Candidates
The PML (N) nominated former Sindh Governor Mamnoon Hussain as its candidate; while the Pakistan People's Party nominated Senator Raza Rabbani (later boycotting); and Pakistan Tehrik-e-Insaaf named Justice Wajihuddin Ahmed.

Mamnoon Hussain
Hussain is an Agra-born business man. He belongs to Sindh and owns a textile business in Karachi. He was born in Uttar Pradesh, India, in 1940. He started his political career in the 60s as a Muslim Leaguer. He is considered loyal to the former Prime Minister Nawaz Sharif.

In 1999, he was elected as the president of the Karachi Chamber of Commerce and Industries (KCCI) and was soon selected by Nawaz Sharif to become governor of Sindh in June 1999, but lost the post after the then Army Chief Gen Pervez Musharraf overthrew the PML-N government in a military coup in October 1999.

Wajiuddin Ahmed
Ahmed is a retired senior justice of the Supreme Court of Pakistan, human rights activist, Jurist Doctor and former professor of law at the Sindh Muslim Law College.

Prior to be elevated as Senior Justice of the Supreme Court, he briefly tenured as the Chief Justice of the Sindh High Court from 1998 until refusing take oath in opposition to martial law in 1999. He remained a strong critic of President Pervez Musharraf, eventually taking up a leading role in Lawyer's movement in 2007 to oppose President Musharraf. Ultimately, he unsuccessfully ran for the presidential elections held in 2007. Since 2011, he has been active in national politicsthrough Pakistan Tehreek-e-Insaf (PTI) and became a forerunner on PTI platform for the presidential election.

Boycotts
On 26 July, the PPP announced its decision to boycott the election. The Awami National Party (ANP) and the Balochistan National Party (BNP) also announced a boycott. They cited as their reason the Supreme Court of Pakistan's decision to change the election date from 6 August without consulting all parties.

Electoral College Strength
The Electoral College of Pakistan is formed by a joint sitting of the six leading political bodies in Pakistan:
 the Senate of Pakistan,
 the National Assembly of Pakistan,
 the Provincial Assembly of the Punjab,
 the Provincial Assembly of Sindh,
 the Provincial Assembly of Balochistan and
 the Provincial Assembly of Khyber Paktunkhwa

So that each province has an equal vote, all provincial assemblies are given exactly 65 votes in the electoral college. This mean that the each member of the Punjab Assembly has 65/370 = 0.176 votes, each member of the Sindh Assembly has 65/168 = 0.387 votes, each member of the KPK Assembly has 65/124 = 0.524 votes and each member of the Balochistan Assembly has 65/65 = 1 vote.

The political composition of these bodies is as follows:

Polls
The country went to the polls at 10:00, 30 July amidst tight security arrangements. Over 1,174 members of the electoral college cast their votes to elect the ceremonial head of the state.

Results
Polling was held simultaneously in the Parliament and provincial assemblies. The legislative assemblies were pronounced polling stations at the outset of polling. Voting ended at 15:00 and after 5 hours the preliminary result was immediately released. Official confirmation of the winner came in the evening. Mamnoon Hussain will be sworn in as the 12th president of Pakistan on 9 September, a day after the incumbent President Asif Ali Zardari completes his five-year term.

|-
!colspan="2" style="background-color:#E9E9E9;text-align:left;vertical-align:top;" |Candidate
! style="background-color:#E9E9E9;text-align:left;vertical-align:top;" |Main supporting party 
! style="background-color:#E9E9E9;text-align:center;" |Senate
! style="background-color:#E9E9E9;text-align:center;" |National Assembly
! style="background-color:#E9E9E9;text-align:center;" |Punjab
! style="background-color:#E9E9E9;text-align:center;" |Sindh
! style="background-color:#E9E9E9;text-align:center;" |Balochistan
! style="background-color:#E9E9E9;text-align:center;" |KP
! style="background-color:#E9E9E9;text-align:center;" |Total
|-
| style="background-color:#228b22;" | || style="text-align:left;" | Mamnoon Hussain
| style="text-align:left;" | Pakistan Muslim League (N)
| style="text-align:right;" colspan=2| 277
| style="text-align:right;" | 54.14
| style="text-align:right;" | 24.76
| style="text-align:right;" | 55
| style="text-align:right;" | 21.49
| style="text-align:right;" | 432
  |-
| style="background-color:#e51616;" | || style="text-align:left;" | Wajihuddin Ahmed
| style="text-align:left;" | Pakistan Tehreek-e-Insaf
| style="text-align:right;" colspan=2| 34
 | style="text-align:right;" | 4
 | style="text-align:right;" | 1.9
 | style="text-align:right;" | 1
 | style="text-align:right;" | 36.17
 | style="text-align:right;" | 77
|-
| colspan=10 style="text-align:left;" |Source: The News
|}
Mamnoon Hussain was widely expected to be victorious. He got 277 votes from the Parliament, 54.14 from the Punjab Assembly, 24.76 from Sindh Assembly, 21.49 from Khyber Pakhtunkhwa Assembly and 55 from the Balochistan Assembly.

On the other hand, Justice (retd) Wajihuddin Ahmed got 34 votes from Parliament, 4 from Punjab Assembly, 1.9 from Sindh Assembly, 36.17 from Khyber Pakhtunkhwa Assembly and one vote from Balochistan Assembly.

Implications
The elections were boycotted by some parties, and some protests were held too. But overall, the elections completed safe and sound. They marked a historic and democratic transition of power. This was the first time in the history of Pakistan a democratically elected civilian president had completed his full five-year term and transitioned power to a new civilian president.

References

2013
2013 elections in Pakistan